This is a list of people who disappeared mysteriously: pre-1910 or whose deaths or exact circumstances thereof are not substantiated. Many people who disappear end up declared dead in absentia and some of these people were possibly subjected to forced disappearance.

This list is a general catch-all; for specialty lists, see lists of people who disappeared.

Before 1800

1800 to 1899

1900s

See also

 List of people who disappeared mysteriously: 1910–1990
 List of people who disappeared mysteriously: 1990–present

 Forced disappearance
 List of fugitives from justice who disappeared
 List of kidnappings
 List of murder convictions without a body
 List of people who disappeared mysteriously at sea
 List of solved missing person cases: pre-2000
 List of solved missing person cases: post-2000
 List of unsolved deaths

References

Disappeared
People